Marcus Ray Jones (born 1975) is an American former professional baseball pitcher who played for the Oakland Athletics of the Major League Baseball during the  season.

References

1975 births
Living people
American expatriate baseball players in Canada
Baseball players from California
Edmonton Trappers players
Long Beach State Dirtbags baseball players
Major League Baseball pitchers
Midland RockHounds players
Modesto A's players
Oakland Athletics players
People from Bellflower, California
Sacramento River Cats players
Southern Oregon Timberjacks players
Vancouver Canadians players
Visalia Oaks players